The Garghabazar Mosque is one of the ancient mosques of Azerbaijan. The mosque is located in Garghabazar village of Fuzuli District, Azerbaijan. This mosque is also known as the Giyas ad-Din Mosque.

History
There is a ligature on the entrance door of the mosque saying: “This mosque is built by Haji Giyas ad-Din a honest creature of Great Allah, in 1095 AH” (1683-1684 Gregorian). Haji Giyas ad-Din mosque has not any balcony and has only one hall built of local construction materials such as stone. A roof of the mosque is arch-shaped. There was not used any wood except in entrance door. The mosque was built in a rocky hill located in the center of the village. A caravanserai built in the same year is located in the southern part of the village.  

According to an architectural analysis of the caravanserai and the mosque, both of them were built by the same architect.

References

1683 establishments in Azerbaijan
Monuments and memorials in Azerbaijan
Mosques in Azerbaijan